Unanimous AI is an American technology company provides artificial swarm intelligence (ASI) technology. Unanimous AI provides a "human swarming" platform "swarm.ai" (formally called UNU) that allows distributed groups of users to collectively predict answers to questions. This process has resulted in successful predictions of major events such as the Kentucky Derby, the Oscars, the Stanley Cup, Presidential Elections, and the World Series.

In 2018, the firm collaborated with Stanford University School of Medicine to study using artificial swarming algorithms for diagnostics. 

In 2019, the  platform was featured on the Amazon Original Series, "Giant Beast That is The Global Economy". The general public used Swarm.ai to forecast box-office results for summer movies (2018). Participants correctly forecasted that Incredibles 2 would significantly outperform other highly anticipated films at the box-office.

In 2020, the firm published an accurate forecast for the 2020 United States presidential election, including correct predictions for all 11 battleground states, and an accurate prediction of the baseball 2020 World Series

References 

2015 establishments in California